John Calnan (February 26, 1932 – December 27, 2016)  was an American comics artist best known as the co-creator of Lucius Fox with writer Len Wein.

Early life
John Calnan graduated from the School of Visual Arts in New York City. One of his instructors was Jerry Robinson.

Career
John Calnan's first work in the comic book industry was with fellow artist Tom Gill on The Lone Ranger series. Calnan later moved into the advertising field.  He stated in a 2011 interview that he "became an advertising art director and TV producer for agencies and still kept the comic work on the side." Calnan began working for DC Comics in 1966 and drew a large number of stories for that publisher's horror comics titles such as Ghosts, The Unexpected, and The Witching Hour.  His earliest credited work at DC Comics appeared in Our Fighting Forces #104 (Nov.–Dec. 1966). He worked primarily with editors Murray Boltinoff, Joe Orlando, and Robert Kanigher. A "Johnny Peril" story drawn by Calnan for The Unexpected series in 1969 was put into inventory and finally published ten years later in the APA-I fanzine. Calnan was the main artist on the "Metamorpho" back-up feature in Action Comics and World's Finest Comics. He later became the regular artist on the Superman and Batman team-up stories which were the main feature in World's Finest Comics. Soon after leaving that series, he and writer Bob Rozakis introduced the Quakemaster, an enemy of the Batman in DC Special #28 (July 1977). Calnan then became the artist on the main Batman solo-series. His debut on the series was "Where Were You On The Night Batman Was Killed?", a four-issue storyline in issues #291–294 (Sept.–Dec. 1977) written by David Vern Reed. Calnan drew the first appearance of Lucius Fox, a supporting cast member of the Batman mythos, in Batman #307 (Jan. 1979). This character was later portrayed by Morgan Freeman in the movies Batman Begins, The Dark Knight, and The Dark Knight Rises.  Calnan's last work for DC Comics appeared in Action Comics #538 (Dec. 1982).

Personal life
Calnan retired in 1996 and died on December 27, 2016, at the age of 84.  He was survived by his wife, Barbara, his daughters, Donna, Susan, and Diane and his grandchildren.

Bibliography

DC Comics

 Action Comics #410–418, 469, 471–472, 537–538 (1972–1983)
 Adventure Comics #453, 492 (1977–1982)
 All-Out War #5 (1980)
 Batman #291–294, 298–299, 301–309, 352 (1977–1982)
 The Brave and the Bold #126, 137 (1976–1977)
 Capt. Storm #18 (1967)
 DC Comics Presents #47, 49 (1982)
 DC Special #25, 28 (1976–1977)
 Detective Comics #467, 484, 490, 519 (1976–1982)
 Falling in Love #130 (1972)
 The Flash #272 (1979)
 Ghosts #2–7, 9, 12–13, 17, 20–21, 27, 29, 32, 35–40, 44, 50–51, 53–54, 56, 59, 62–63, 73 (1971–1979)
 G.I. Combat #191, 201, 203 (1976–1977)
 Girls' Love Stories #155, 172 (1970–1972)
 House of Mystery #212, 251–253 (1973–1977)
 Legion of Super-Heroes vol. 2 #260–261, 271 (1980–1981)
 Limited Collectors' Edition #C-32 (1974)
 Mystery in Space #111 (1980)
 The New Adventures of Superboy #10, 15–17, 19–21, 23–24, 32 (1980–1982)
 Our Army at War #176 (1967)
 Our Fighting Forces #104, 110 (1966–1967)
 Secrets of Haunted House #12 (1978)
 Secrets of Sinister House #18 (1974)
 Superman #371, 373 (1982)
 The Superman Family #182–184, 187, 194–196, 198, 201–202, 204–206, 208–216, 221 (1977–1982)
 Superman's Girl Friend, Lois Lane #121 (1972)
 The Unexpected #118, 121, 127, 129–130, 134, 137, 144, 157–158, 164, 189, 193, 204 (1979–1980)
 The Witching Hour #16–18, 20, 28, 31, 47, 58, 64 (1971–1976)
 Wonder Woman #265–266 (Wonder Girl back-up story) (1980)
 World's Finest Comics #218–220, 229, 232–242, 244, 281 (1973–1982)
 Young Love #97 (1972)

George A. Pflaum
 Treasure Chest of Fun and Fact #v16#2 [288], #v16#4 [290], #v16#8 [294] (1960)

Western Publishing
 Mystery Comics Digest #19 (1974)

References

External links 
 
 
 John Calnan at Mike's Amazing World of Comics

1932 births
2016 deaths
20th-century American artists
Advertising artists and illustrators
American comics artists
DC Comics people
School of Visual Arts alumni
Silver Age comics creators